Georg Kaltenbrunner is a visual effects artist, who has won two Annie Awards.

He won a 2017 Annie Award in Outstanding Achievement, Animated Effects in a Live Action Production for his work on Doctor Strange. Kaltenbrunner won the award along with Michael Marcuzzi, Thomas Bevan, Andrew Graham and Jihyun Yoon. It marked his second consecutive win of an Annie in this category.

Selected filmography
 Avengers: Age of Ultron (2015)
 Doctor Strange (2016)
 Only the Brave (2017)

References

External links

Living people
Annie Award winners
Year of birth missing (living people)